County Tipperary was a parliamentary constituency in Ireland, which from 1801 to 1885 returned two Members of Parliament (MPs) to the House of Commons of the United Kingdom.

Boundaries
This constituency comprised the whole of County Tipperary, except the parliamentary boroughs of Cashel (1801–1870) and Clonmel (1801–1885). After the Sligo and Cashel Disfranchisement Act 1870, the borough of Cashel ceased to have separate representation, and eligible voters were added to the roll for the county constituency.

In 1885, the constituency was divided into East Tipperary, Mid Tipperary, North Tipperary, and South Tipperary.

Members of Parliament

Elections

Elections in the 1830s

 

 

Hely-Hutchinson succeeded to the peerage, becoming 3rd Earl of Donoughmore and causing a by-election.

 

 

 

Sheil was appointed as Commissioner of Greenwich Hospital, requiring a by-election.

 

Sheil was appointed as vice-president of the Board of Trade, requiring a by-election.

Elections in the 1840s

 
 

Maher's death caused a by-election.

Otway-Cave's death caused a by-election.

Elections in the 1850s

 

Sadleir was expelled from the House of Commons due to failing to surrender to arrest warrants for his involvement in a fraud, causing a by-election.

Elections in the 1860s
O'Donoghue resigned, causing a by-election.

 

Dillon's death caused a by-election.

Moore's death caused a by-election.

Elections in the 1870s
Rossa was disqualified as he was a convicted felon, causing a by-election.

 

White resigned, causing a by-election.

Mitchel was declared ineligible, causing a by-election.

Mitchel was again declared ineligible (and died) and, on 26 May 1875, Moore was awarded the seat.

O'Callaghan's death caused a by-election.

Elections in the 1880s

Dillon resigned, causing a by-election.

Smyth was appointed secretary to the Irish loan fund board, causing a by-election.

References

Sources 

The Parliaments of England by Henry Stooks Smith (1st edition published in three volumes 1844–50), 2nd edition edited (in one volume) by F.W.S. Craig (Political Reference Publications 1973)

Westminster constituencies in County Tipperary (historic)
Constituencies of the Parliament of the United Kingdom established in 1801
Constituencies of the Parliament of the United Kingdom disestablished in 1885